Tautau Moga (born 6 December 1993) is a Samoa international rugby league footballer who plays as a  and er for the St George Illawarra Dragons  in the NRL. 

He previously played for the Sydney Roosters, North Queensland Cowboys, Brisbane Broncos,  Newcastle Knights and South Sydney Rabbitohs in the National Rugby League.

Background
He was born in Ipswich, Queensland, Australia.

Moga is of Samoan descent. Growing up in Ipswich, he played his junior rugby league for the Redbank Plains Bears and Springfield Panthers. He attended St Peter Claver College in Ipswich, where he was the recipient of the 2010 Ronald Holmes memorial trophy as the school's Player of the Year. He represented the Australian Schoolboys in 2010.

Moga joined the Sydney Roosters system at age 14. He took the next step and played for the Roosters SG Ball team before being fast tracked into the Toyota Cup team in 2011. Moga turned heads in the competition, scoring 18 tries in 13 games. In late 2011, he would have become the youngest Roosters debutant in 73 years if not for a new NRL rule barring players under the age of 18 from playing first grade.

Playing career

2012
Moga joined the Sydney Roosters first grade squad and started the season playing in the Toyota Cup and for the Newtown Jets in the NSW Cup. 

Moga played in 14 matches and scored 7 tries in his debut year in the NRL.

2013
Moga spent the season on the sidelines after suffering two anterior cruciate ligament (ACL) injuries. One of the injuries happened while playing in a comeback match in the NYC.

2014

On 29 June, Moga joined the North Queensland Cowboys mid-season, signing with them until the end of the 2016 season. In Round 21 against the Gold Coast Titans, Moga scored his first try club for the North Queensland side in the 28-8 win at 1300SMILES Stadium. Moga finished his first year with the North Queensland Cowboys in the 2014 NRL season with him playing in 11 matches and scoring three tries. 

On 7 October 2014, Moga was selected for the Samoan 24-man squad for the 2014 Four Nations series. 

On 23 October 2014, Moga alongside Samoa teammates Reni Maitua and Sauaso Sue were fined $10,000 for their involvement in a brawl in at a nightclub at Fortitude Valley. The trio were dropped for 2 matches but later returned to play against New Zealand, Moga making his Samoan international debut on the wing and scoring a try in Samoa's 14-12 loss at Toll Stadium in Whangarei, New Zealand. Moga played in 2 matches in the tournament.

2015
Moga played for North Queensland in the 2015 NRL Auckland Nines. 

On 2 May, he played for Samoa in their Polynesian Cup clash with Pacific rivals Tonga, playing at fullback in Samoa's 18-16 loss at Cbus Super Stadium. During the match, he tore his Anterior cruciate ligament, having to undergo a third knee reconstruction, ruling him out for the rest of the year. 

He finished off the 2015 season early, having played in 6 matches for the North Queensland outfit.

2016
In round 18 of the 2016 season, Moga made his return from injury against the Canberra Raiders. 

On 24 October, he signed a two-year contract with the Brisbane Broncos starting in 2017.

2017
In July, after playing in 17 matches for the Brisbane club up to that point, Moga signed a three-year contract with the Newcastle Knights starting in 2018.

2018
In round 1 of the 2018 season, Moga made his debut for the Newcastle side in their 19-18 golden point extra-time win over the Manly-Warringah Sea Eagles. In round 4, he tore his Anterior cruciate ligament while scoring a try in Newcastle's 12-30 loss against the St. George Illawarra Dragons, meaning he would miss the rest of the season after facing his fourth knee reconstruction.

2019
After spending time recovering from his injury and playing in the Canterbury Cup NSW, Moga managed to play in six NRL games for the Newcastle outfit.

2020
In 2020, Moga played four NRL games for the Newcastle club, spending most of the year in Canterbury Cup NSW. In November, he signed a contract with the South Sydney Rabbitohs for 2021.

2021
Moga made only one appearance for South Sydney in the 2021 NRL season.  

On 15 October, Moga signed a contract to join St. George Illawarra for the 2022 season.issue.

2022
Moga debuted for St. George Illawarra in round 12 of the 2022 NRL season, scoring a try in a 34-24 victory against Canterbury.  In round 23, Moga scored a hat-trick in the clubs 46-26 victory over the hapless  Gold Coast side. Moga finished the 2022 NRL season playing 10 games and scoring 7 tries, this was the first time he had reached double figures in games in a season since 2017. 

On the 21st October, Moga re-signed with St. George Illawarra for the 2023 season.

Alleged assault
On 11 January 2019, it was revealed that Moga had been charged by police for common assault. The incident took place on Boxing Day 2018 where Moga allegedly slapped a taxi driver twice on the head. According to The Daily Telegraph, Moga and another man allegedly were refused entry into a King Street, Newcastle pub before getting into the taxi.  

Moga's club Newcastle released a statement saying "The Newcastle Knights were made aware of an incident involving a player on December 26, 2018, The club alerted the NRL Integrity Unit at an appropriate time and are co-operating with the NSW Police.  No further comment will be made".

In April 2019, Moga was fined $60,000, half of which was suspended, by Newcastle.

Statistics

NRL
 Statistics are correct to the end of the 2016 season

International

References

1993 births
Living people
Australian rugby league players
Australian sportspeople of Samoan descent
Samoa national rugby league team players
St. George Illawarra Dragons players
South Sydney Rabbitohs players
Newcastle Knights players
North Queensland Cowboys players
Sydney Roosters players
Brisbane Broncos players
Newtown Jets NSW Cup players
Mackay Cutters players
Junior Kangaroos players
Rugby league centres
Rugby league wingers
Australian Latter Day Saints
Rugby league players from Ipswich, Queensland